Čentiba is a settlement southeast of Lendava in the Prekmurje region of Slovenia, close to the border with Hungary.

The local church in the settlement is dedicated to the Nativity of Mary and belongs to the Parish of Lendava.

References

External links
Čentiba on Geopedia

Populated places in the Municipality of Lendava